The Antalya Diplomacy Forum (ADF) is an annual conference on international diplomacy that has been held in Antalya, Turkey since 2021. During the forum, ideas and views on diplomacy, policy and business are exchanged by policy makers, diplomats and academics. 

The meeting brings together some 3,000 participants for up to three days to discuss global issues across several sessions.

History 
The Antalya Diplomacy Forum was founded by the Turkish Foreign Minister Mevlüt Çavuşoğlu and is aimed at heads of state and government, foreign ministers and high-ranking representatives of the international organization as well as representatives from business, science, civil society and the media.

The first meeting was originally planned to be held on March 2020, but was postponed due to the COVID-19 pandemic.

On 10 March 2022, Russian Foreign Minister Sergei Lavrov, Ukrainian Foreign Minister Dmytro Kuleba and Turkey's Foreign Minister Mevlüt Çavuşoğlu met for the first high-level talks since the 2022 Russian invasion of Ukraine in Antalya Diplomacy Forum within the framework of Russia–Ukraine peace negotiations.

Purpose 
At this forum, under the theme of "Recoding Diplomacy", senior politicians, diplomats, military and security experts from up to 75 countries participate to discuss the current issues in diplomacy and energy policies.

The intention of the conference is to address the topical main global issues and to debate and analyze the challenges in the present and the future in line with the concept of networked security. A focal point of the conference is the discussion and the exchange of views on the development of the transatlantic relations as well as European and global security in the 21st century.

The conference is organized privately and therefore not an official government event. It is used exclusively for discussion; an authorization for binding intergovernmental decisions does not exist. Furthermore, there is – contrary to usual conventions – no common final communiqué. The high-level meeting is also used to discrete background discussions between the participants. ADF has partnerships with the Atlantic Council, Mexican Council on Foreign Relations, Munich Security Conference and RSIS.

Editions

2021 

The meeting was originally planned to be held on March 2020, but was postponed due to the COVID-19 pandemic.

A total of 11 heads of state and government, 45 foreign ministers, and attendance at ministerial level were part of the forum, Additionally, the event was attended by about 60 representatives of international organisations and high-level personalities, guests from the business and academic world, and 256 young people in total, including undergraduate, graduate, and doctoral students from more than 50 universities.

Two leaders' sessions, 15 panels, 25 side events, including ADF Talks, and two youth forums were organised.

2022 

The 2022 edition of the forum took place on 11–13 March, under the overarching theme of "Recoding Diplomacy". A total of 17 heads of state and government, 80 foreign ministers and 39 representatives of international organisations. 

The panels that took place were named as followes 

 Recoding Diplomacy
 Democratic Governance
 Leadership and Diplomacy
 Energy Security
 AI, Metaverse and all else
 Fighting Racism and Discrimination
 A Strategic Autonomy for Europe?
 Development in Africa
 Latin America and the Caribbean
 Cooperation and Competition in the Asia-Pacific
 Afghanistan
 Confronting Disinformation
 Irregular Migration
 Regional Cooperation in the Middle East
 Countering Terrorism
 Empowering Women
 Resolution of Maritime Disputes
 Green Economy
 Climate Change & Energy transition
 Revisiting Security in Europe

See also 

 Diplomacy
 International relations
 Asian Leadership Conference
 Eurofi
 European Business Summit
 International Transport Forum
 World Knowledge Forum

References

External links 

 

International conferences in Turkey
Annual events in Europe
Diplomatic conferences in Turkey
History of Antalya
Global policy organizations
21st-century diplomatic conferences
Recurring events established in 2021
Organizations established in 2021
2021 establishments in Turkey